William Forsyth Marshall (born 9 May 1933) is a Scottish former professional footballer who played as a centre forward.

Career
Born in Rutherglen, Marshall joined Bradford City from Rutherglen Glencairn in January 1957. He made 33 league appearances for the club, scoring 16 goals; he also played in 1 FA Cup match, scoring 3 goals. He left the club in February 1959 to join Swindon Town, for whom he made 30 league appearances (scoring 1 goal), as well as 1 League Cup game, before moving to Chesterfield.

Sources

References

1933 births
Living people
Scottish footballers
Rutherglen Glencairn F.C. players
Bradford City A.F.C. players
Swindon Town F.C. players
Chesterfield F.C. players
English Football League players
Association football forwards